I prepotenti (The Bullies) is a 1958 Italian comedy film directed by Mario Amendola. It has a sequel, Prepotenti più di prima (1959).

Cast 
 Aldo Fabrizi: Cesare Pinelli 
 Nino Taranto: Domenico Esposito, aka Mimì
 Ave Ninchi: Clelia Pinelli
 Wandisa Guida: Marcella Pinelli
 Luca Ronconi: Gennarino Esposito
 Giuseppe Porelli: Commissioner 
 Carlo Taranto: Numa 
 Ferruccio Amendola: Alfredo Pinelli 
 Clara Bindi: Carmela Esposito 
 Rosita Pisano: Aunt Rosa 
 Mario Riva: Vigile

References

External links

I prepotenti at Variety Distribution

1958 films
Italian comedy films
1958 comedy films
Films with screenplays by Ruggero Maccari
1950s Italian films